Sigvald Berg (November 15, 1894 - December 4, 1985) was an American architect who designed many buildings in the state of Montana, especially Helena. In 1954, he designed the first residence hall for male students on the campus of Montana State University in Bozeman.

References

1894 births
1985 deaths
People from Helena, Montana
Montana State University alumni
Architects from Montana
20th-century American architects